The NCAA Women's Division II Indoor Track and Field Championship is an annual collegiate indoor track and field competition for women from Division II institutions organised by the National Collegiate Athletic Association. Athletes' performances in individual championships earn points for their institutions and the team with the most points receives the NCAA team title in track and field. A separate NCAA Division II men's competition is also held.

These two events are separate from the NCAA Women's Division II Outdoor Track and Field Championships and NCAA Men's Division II Outdoor Track and Field Championships held during the spring.

The first edition of the championship was held in 1983.

Minnesota State are the current champions. The most successful program, with 12 titles, is Abilene Christian.

Events

Track events

 
Sprint events
60 meter dash 
200 meter dash 
400 meter dash 

Distance events
800 meter run
Mile run
3,000 meter run
5,000 meter run

Hurdle Events
60 meter high hurdles

Relay events
1,600 meter relay
Distance medley relay

Field events

 
Jumping events
High jump
Pole vault
Long jump
Triple jump

Throwing events
Shot put
Weight throw

Multi-events
Pentathlon

Summary

Champions

Team titles
List updated through 2022.

Individual titles
Note: Top 10 teams only
List updated through 2021.

 Schools highlight in yellow have reclassified athletics from NCAA Division II.

Championship Records

See also
AIAW Intercollegiate Women's Outdoor Track and Field Champions
NCAA Men's Outdoor Track and Field Championship (Division I, Division II, Division III)
NCAA Women's Outdoor Track and Field Championship (Division I, Division II, Division III)
NCAA Men's Indoor Track and Field Championship (Division I, Division II, Division III)
NCAA Women's Indoor Track and Field Championship (Division I, Division III)
Pre-NCAA Outdoor Track and Field Champions

References

External links
NCAA Division II women's indoor track and field

 Indoor
NCAA women Division II
Indoor track, women's
Recurring sporting events established in 1983
Women's athletics competitions